The Meeteetse Formation is a Late Cretaceous geologic formation occurring in Wyoming.

The formation is described by W.G. Pierce as gray to white clayey sand, drab sandstone, gray and brown shale, and bentonitic clay.  It can form badlands.

Dinosaur remains are among the fossils that have been recovered from the formation, although none have yet been referred to a specific genus.

See also

 List of dinosaur-bearing rock formations
 List of stratigraphic units with indeterminate dinosaur fossils

Footnotes

References
 Weishampel, David B.; Dodson, Peter; and Osmólska, Halszka (eds.): The Dinosauria, 2nd, Berkeley: University of California Press. 861 pp. .

Campanian Stage